Lipowa Śląska railway station is a station in Lipowa, Opole Voivodeship, Poland.

The present railway station building was constructed in 1912.

Connections 

288 Nysa - Brzeg
329 Szydłów - Lipowa Śląska

References 

Brzeg County
Railway stations in Opole Voivodeship
Railway stations in Poland opened in 1847